An oyster is a bivalve mollusc.

Oyster may also refer to:

 Ostreidae, the family of true oysters

Arts, entertainment and media
 Oyster (magazine), Australian magazine about pop culture
 The Oyster, a Victorian erotic magazine published in London
 Oyster (novel), by Janette Turner Hospital
 "Oysters" (short story), by Anton Chekhov
 Oyster, a character in the novel Lullaby by Chuck Palahniuk
 Oyster (album), by Heather Nova
 "Oyster", a 1995 song by Jawbreaker from Dear You

Businesses
 Oyster (company), a commercial streaming service for digital e-books
 Oyster Yachts, a British boat building company

Technology
 Oyster card, a smart card utilising near field communication used on public transport in and around London, UK
 Oyster wave energy converter, a device that transforms the motion of ocean waves to create electricity
 Oyster (company), an e-book subscription service

Other uses
 Oyster (fowl), a cut of poultry
 A shade of the color beige
 Oyster, Virginia, an unincorporated community

See also
 Rocky Mountain oysters, bull testicles served as food
 Oyster Plant (disambiguation)